Hans-Jürgen Becher (born 21 September 1941) is a retired German footballer who played as a defender. He completed 32 matches in the Oberliga West and made 201 appearances in the Bundesliga for Schalke 04.

References

External links 
 

1941 births
Living people
German footballers
Association football defenders
Bundesliga players
FC Schalke 04 players
Sportspeople from Gelsenkirchen
Footballers from North Rhine-Westphalia